The Walsall Canal is a narrow canal,  long, forming part of the Birmingham Canal Navigations, and passing around the western side of Walsall, West Midlands, England.

Route

The canal runs from Ryders Green Junction where it meets the Wednesbury Old Canal and the Ridgeacre Branch and immediately drops through the eight Ryders Green Locks to the  Walsall Level. At Doe Bank Junction (Tame Valley Junction) it meets the Tame Valley Canal and the very short Ocker Hill Tunnel Branch, now private moorings, which fed water to the Ocker Hill pumps to replenish the Wolverhampton Level. It passes northwards, past the junction of the derelict Gospel Oak Branch and under the West Midlands Metro line, passes the short Bradley Branch at Moorcroft Junction. In this area it passes the huge iron gates of the Patent Shaft factory, (these gates have now been resited to a traffic island by the bus station in Wednesbury) which remain despite the factory's closure in 1980. It then passes the short Anson Branch (which once led to the Bentley Canal, abandoned 1961) and under the M6 motorway just south of junction 10. The very short Walsall Town Arm at Walsall Junction leads into Walsall itself while the main canal rises through eight locks to meet the Wyrley & Essington Canal at Birchills Junction.

The canal starts at the Birmingham Level, descends  to the Walsall Level, then rises  to the Wolverhampton Level.

History
The canal was built in four distinct stages. It started life as the Broadwaters Extension to the Wednesbury Canal which opened in 1785 to serve collieries in Moxley. This section was authorised as a detached part of the Birmingham & Fazeley Canal under that canal's original Act.

Meanwhile from the other direction, the Birchills Branch of the Wyrley and Essington Canal reached Bloxwich Wharf to the north-west of Walsall by 1798.

What was by then known as the Birmingham, Birmingham and Fazeley Canal Company was authorised by the combined company's sixth Act of Parliament on 17 April 1794 to extend the canal from Broadwaters to Walsall. It allowed the Company to borrow £45,000, with which to construct the canal to Walsall and three branches to serve iron-stone and coal mines in the locality, all to be completed within three years. Construction began at Broadwaters and reached Darlaston by May 1798. The second phase of construction began in April 1798: excavation was completed in 1799 but the job remained unfinished in 1800.

The canal was mapped by John Snape (1737–1816) in 1808 and this was to be his last known map.

The small gap between the Birmingham Canal Navigations line to Walsall and the Wyrley and Essington Canal's Birchills Branch was of concern to businessmen to the north of Walsall, whose access to the south was by a very circuitous route. An independent canal to link the two was planned, but in 1839 the BCN agreed to build a connection. The Walsall Junction Canal was completed in March 1841, its  containing eight locks and completing the through route.

Points of interest

Gallery

From north to south:

See also

Canals of the United Kingdom
History of the British canal system

References

External links

Birmingham Canal Navigations
Canals in the West Midlands (county)
Transport in Walsall
Canals opened in 1841